Parliamentary elections were held in Krasnodar Krai on 10 September 2017. After the previous elections in 2012, United Russia was the largest party in the Legislative Assembly with 95 seats.

The number of seats in the sixth convocation of the Legislative Assembly of the Krasnodar Krai was lowered from 100 to 70.

Electoral system
Under current election laws, the Legislative Assembly is elected on a single day for a term of five years, with parallel voting. 35 seats are elected by party-list proportional representation with a 5% electoral threshold, with the other half elected in 35 single-member constituencies by first-past-the-post voting.

Participating parties
The parties on the ballot.

Result

See also
2017 Russian regional elections

References

2017 elections in Russia
2017
Regional legislative elections in Russia